The Shanghai Dragons are a Chinese esports team founded in 2017 that compete in the Overwatch League (OWL). The Dragons began playing competitive Overwatch in the 2018 season.

All rostered players during the OWL season (including the playoffs) are included, even if they did not make an appearance.

All-time roster

References

External links 
 Shanghai Dragons roster

 
Shanghai Dragons
Shanghai